Erik Gudmund Eriksson Söderin (born 10 October 1952 in Frösön) is a Swedish former alpine skier who competed in the 1976 Winter Olympics.

External links
 

1952 births
Swedish male alpine skiers
Alpine skiers at the 1976 Winter Olympics
Olympic alpine skiers of Sweden
People from Frösön
Living people
Sportspeople from Jämtland County
20th-century Swedish people